Biliran Airport  is an airport serving the general area of the island of Biliran, located in the province of Biliran in the Philippines. There was only one airline flying this route from Cebu to Naval 5x weekly; Air Juan, until they went bankrupt in 2020.

The Biliran airport was constructed in the 1970s as an adjunct of the Busali Ranch, believed to have been acquired by the administration of then President Ferdinand Marcos.

Airlines and destinations

References

External links
 Biliran Island

Airports in the Philippines
Buildings and structures in Biliran
Transportation in the Visayas